Jagadguru Abhinava Vidyatirtha Mahaswami (born as Srinivasa Sastri) (13 November 1917 - 21 September 1989) was the 35th Jagadguru of the Sringeri Sharada Peetham, which has been occupied by an unbroken lineage of gurus stretching back to the Advaitic philosopher Adi Shankaracharya, who established the matha for the propagation of Advaitha Vedanta.

Childhood
He was born on 13 November 1917, Deepavali day to Venkatalakshmi Ammal and Rama Sastry, a primary school teacher in Bangalore. His childhood name was Srinivasa Shastri. His sacred thread ceremony was performed at Sringeri Sharada temple and he continued his vedic education at the Math. He slowly came under the influence of his Guru, Sri Chandrashekhara Bharathi Mahaswami.

Embracing Sanyasa
Sri Chandrashekhara Bharati III Mahaswamigal announced his desire to appoint Srinivasa Sastry as the successor-designate (i.e., as the 35th Jagadguru acharya) and give him Sanyasa. He was just 14 years old at that time. The Shishya Sweekaram ceremony took place on the 22nd day of May, 1931 and the brahmachari received the saffron robes, the sacred staff and the kamandalu (water pot) from the acharya. The newly initiated sanyasi was given the Yogapatta Sri Abhinava Vidyatirtha in line with the Dashanami Sampradaya of Shri Adishankaracharya.

Reign as Jagadguru

Sri Abhinava Vidyatirtha Mahaswamigal was a vedantin par excellence and an adept in Yoga as well. Under the tutelage of his Guru, he attained self-realization before he even reached 20 years of age.

On 26 September 1954, Sri Chandrasekhara Bharati shed his mortal coil. About 20 days later, on 16 October 1954, Sri Abhinava Vidya Tirtha took over as the 35th Jagadguru Shankaracharya of the Sringeri Sharada Peetham.

He was an able administrator and he is credited with bringing enormous changes in the functioning of the Math. He constructed a guest house for visitors to the Math. He renovated the Ammanavaru and Ganapati shrines in the Sharada temple, converted a huge bamboo forest into cultivable land, laid roads of access in Sringeri and introduced irrigation facilities. He initiated the work of constructing a bridge across the Tunga river in Sringeri, which is now called the Vidyatirtha Setu. Sharada Dhanvantari Hospital was constructed in Sringeri during his tenure.  He established the Jnanodaya school and inaugurated it in April 1988.

In May 1979 he organized a historic meeting of the heads of all the four Maths established by Sri Adi Sankara - Sringeri, Puri, Dwarka and JoshiMath.

Appointment of the successor

Sri  Abhinava Vidyatirtha Mahaswamigal appointed the brahmachari Seetharama Anjaneyalu  as his successor designate, i.e., the 36th Jagadguru of the Sringeri Sharada Peetham in 1974 and gave him the Yogapatta (monastic name) Sri Bharathi Teertha Mahaswami.

Sri  Abhinava Vidyatirtha Mahaswami died on 21 September 1989. His Adhishtanam is located in Narasimha Vana in Sringeri.

Legacy

Sri Vidyateertha foundation was established in 1991 in his honour.

His life history has been chronicled in the book "The Multifaceted Jivanmukhta"  by another disciple Sri R.M.Umesh.

An illustrated story book has been published in 4 languages.

See also

Sringeri Sharada Peetham
Jagadguru of Sringeri Sharada Peetham
Advaita Vedanta
Adi Shankara
Smartism
Chandrashekhara Bharati III
Vidyaranya
Bharathi Teertha Mahaswami

References

Further reading
 The Multifaceted Jivanmukta
 Yoga, Enlightenment and Perfection (Talks of Jagadguru with Brahmasri R.M.Umesh) 
 Edifying Parables (Speeches of Swamigal)
 Jagadguru Sri Abhinava Vidyatheertha 
 Divine Discourses
 Exalting Elucidations
 From Sorrows to Bliss
 Didactic Treatises
 Enlightening Expositions
 Personification of Perfection
Gems of Spiritual Wisdom

Advaita Vedanta
Sringeri Sharada Peetham
Shankaracharyas
Indian Hindu monks
Advaitin philosophers
1917 births
1989 deaths